The Cal Poly Universities Rose Float is a joint entry of a rose float into the Pasadena Tournament of Roses Association's annual Rose Parade by both Cal Poly Pomona and Cal Poly San Luis Obispo universities.  These two institutions have continuously participated in the parade since 1949; winning the Award of Merit in their first year. The Cal Poly floats have led in introducing technology to the Parade, including the first use of hydraulics for animation in 1968, the first use of computer-controlled animation in 1978, the first use of fiber optics in 1982, animated deco in 2014, and the first to create a color changing floral effect in 2017.  As of January 2, 2020, the floats have won 60 awards. This program is one of the longest consecutive running self-built  entries in the parade, as well as the only "self built" float designed and constructed entirely by students year-round on two campuses.  They compete against professional float builders who manufacture entries for sponsors, many of them with development budgets approaching $1 million.  This tradition continues today and marks the partnership between the two campuses.

Road & Track magazine did a road test of the Cal Poly Universities Rose Float as part of their annual April issue of unusual vehicles.

For the 2022 float, a football tribute was added in memory of John Madden, who received degrees from Cal Poly San Luis Obispo. The football read "Madden, Ride High", referring to the school's fight song "Ride High You Mustangs".

History

List of Cal Poly Rose Floats

Awards
Since 1949 the floats have won 61 trophies (over 83% winning rate).

See also
Tournament of Roses Parade themes
Tournament of Roses floats

References

External links
 Cal Poly Pomona Rose Float
 Cal Poly San Luis Obispo Rose Float
 Special Collections History page
 Unofficial Documentary YouTube Site

Cal Poly Universities Tournament of Roses Parade Float
California State Polytechnic University, Pomona
Cal Poly Pomona student life
Culture of Pomona, California
California Polytechnic State University
San Luis Obispo County, California
Organizations based in Pomona, California